In Mandaeism, misha is anointing sesame oil used during rituals such as the masbuta (baptism) and masiqta (death mass), both of which are performed by Mandaean priests.

In the Qolasta

Several prayers in the Qolasta are recited over the oil, including prayers 48, 63, and 73. In some prayers, misha referred to as misha dakia, or "pure oil."

See also
Holy anointing oil
Oil of catechumens
Riha (incense)

References

Mandaic words and phrases
Oils
Mandaean religious objects